The Purple Highway is a lost 1923 American comedy-drama film directed by Henry Kolker and starring Madge Kennedy. It was released by Paramount Pictures. The film is based on a 1921 Broadway play, Dear Me, by Hale Hamilton and Luther Reed. Hamilton's wife Grace La Rue starred in the play version.

Cast
Madge Kennedy as April Blair
Monte Blue as Edgar Prentice aka Edgar Craig
Vincent Coleman as Dudley Quail
Pedro de Cordoba as Joe Renard
Dore Davidson as Manny Bean
Emily Fitzroy as Mrs. Carney
William H. Tooker as Mr. Quail
Winifred Harris as Mrs. Quail
John W. Jenkins as Shakespeare Jones
Charles Kent as Mr. Ogilvie

References

External links

Lantern slide coming attraction; The Purple Highway

1923 films
American silent feature films
American films based on plays
Lost American films
Paramount Pictures films
1923 comedy-drama films
1920s English-language films
American black-and-white films
1920s American films
Silent American comedy-drama films
1923 lost films